Kip Kubin (born March 4, 1965) is an American film director, producer, writer, musician, and sound designer.

He is best known for being in the band Venus Hum (MCA Records, BMG Records, and Universal Records) but transitioned to directing and writing narrative films in 2013.

Awards
In 2011, he was nominated for a Dove Award for Short Form Music Video of the Year for Amy Grant's "Better Than A Hallelujah".

Filmography
Kubin has directed a handful of acclaimed short films, including Each Time Again (2013) and Seraphim (2014). In 2013, he also directed the short film A Walk For Andrei.

Personal life
Kip lives in Nashville, Tennessee.

References

Living people
1965 births